Chandralekha may refer to:

Films
Chandralekha (1948 film), an Indian Tamil film directed and produced by S. S. Vasan starring M. K. Radha
Chandralekha (1995 film), an Indian Tamil film directed by Nambirajan starring Vijay
Chandralekha (1997 film), an Indian Malayalam film directed by Priyadarshan starring Mohanlal
Chandralekha (1998 film), an eponymous Indian Telugu remake of the Malayalam film. The film was directed by Krishna Vamsi starring Nagarjuna 
Chandralekha (2014 film), an Indian Kannada film directed by Om Prakash Rao starring Chiranjeevi Sarja

People
 Chandralekha (dancer), dancer and choreographer from India
Chandralekha Perera, Sri Lankan singer
 V. S. Chandralekha, Indian politician

Songs
 "Chandralekha" (song), a techno electronic song from Thiruda Thiruda, composed by A. R. Rahman

Television
Chandralekha (TV series), a 2014 premiering Tamil soap opera that airs on Sun TV